Newman is a surname of English origin and may refer to many people:

 
The surname Newman is widespread in the core Anglosphere.

A
Abram Newman (1736–1799), British grocer
Adrian Newman (disambiguation), multiple people
Al Newman (born 1960), American baseball player
Alan Newman (baseball) (born 1969), American baseball player
Alec Newman (born 1974), Scottish actor
Alfred Newman (disambiguation), multiple people
 Ali Newman (born 1977), better known as Brother Ali, American rapper
Alison Newman (born 1968), British actress
Allen George Newman (1875–1940), American sculptor
Alysha Newman (born 1994), Canadian pole vaulter
Amy Hauck Newman, American medicinal chemist
Andrea Newman (1938–2019), British author
Andrew Newman (disambiguation), multiple people
Angelia Thurston Newman (1837–1910), American poet and writer
Anne B. Newman (born 1955), American gerontologist
Arnold Newman (1918–2006), American photographer
Aubrey Newman (1903–1994), American army general
Aubrey Newman (born 1927), British historian
Augustus Charles Newman (1904–1972), English lieutenant colonel
Avis Newman (born 1946), English artist

B
Barnett Newman (1905–1970), American artist
Barry Newman (born 1938), American actor
Bernard Newman (disambiguation), multiple people
Beryl Newman (1911–1998), American soldier
Byron Newman, British photographer

C
Campbell Newman (born 1963), Australian politician
A. C. Newman, Canadian musician and composer
Cecil Newman (1903–1976), American civic leader and publisher
Charlie Newman (1857–1922), Welsh rugby player
Charles Newman (disambiguation), multiple people
Chris Newman (disambiguation), multiple people
Colin Newman (born 1954), English musician
Constance Berry Newman (born 1935), American attorney and diplomat

D
Daisy Newman (1904–1994), American author
Dan Newman (born 1963), Canadian politician
David Newman, multiple people
Don Newman (disambiguation), multiple people
Donald J. Newman (1930–2007, American mathematician

E
Ed Newman (born 1951), American football player
Edward Newman (disambiguation), multiple people
Edwin Newman (1919–2010), American journalist
Emil Newman (1911–1984), American music director and conductor
Eric Newman (disambiguation), multiple people
Ernest Newman (1868–1959), English music critic and musicologist
Ezra T. Newman (1929–2021), American physicist

F
Felice Newman, American author
Frances Newman (1883–1928), American writer
Francis Newman (died 1660), English colonist
Francis William Newman (1805–1897), English scholar and philosopher
Frank Newman (disambiguation), multiple people
Fred Newman (disambiguation), multiple people

G
G. F. Newman (born 1934), English television producer and writer.
George Newman (disambiguation), multiple people
Geraldine Newman (born 1934), British actress
Greatrex Newman (1892–1984), British  author, songwriter and screenwriter

H
Harry Newman (disambiguation), multiple people
Henry Newman (disambiguation), multiple people
Hugh George de Willmott Newman (1905–1979), British Independent Catholic and Neo-Gnostic bishop

J
Jack Newman (disambiguation), multiple people
Jaime Ray Newman (born 1978), American actress and singer
James Newman (disambiguation), multiple people
Jamie Newman (born 1997), American football player
Jay Newman (1948–2007), Canadian philosopher
Jeff Newman (disambiguation), multiple people
Jocelyn Newman (1937–2018), Australian politician
Joey Newman (born 1976), American composer
John Newman (disambiguation), multiple people
Johnny Newman (born 1963), American basketball player
Jon O. Newman (born 1932), American judge
Joseph Newman (disambiguation), multiple people
Judith Newman (born 1961), American journalist and author

K
Kenneth Newman (1926–2017), British police officer
Kevin Newman (disambiguation), multiple people
Kim Newman (born 1959), British journalist and novelist

L
Laraine Newman (born 1952), American comedian
Lesléa Newman (born 1955), American author and editor
Leslie Newman, American screenwriter
Lionel Newman (1916–1989), American film score composer

M

Malik Newman (born 1997), American basketball player in the Israeli Basketball Premier League
Marie Newman (born 1964), American politician and former representative of Illinois's 3rd congressional district
Mark Newman, British physicist
Mark Newman (1949–2020), American baseball coach and executive
Mark Newman, American sculptor and illustrator
Max Newman (1897–1984), British mathematician
Melvin Spencer Newman (1908–1993), American chemist
Michael Newman (disambiguation), multiple people
Muriel Newman (born 1950), New Zealand politician

N
Nanette Newman (born 1934), English actress and author
Nick Newman (born 1958), British cartoonist
Nick Newman, (born 1935), American professor

O
Oliver Michael Griffiths Newman (born 1941), Australian metallurgist and ornithologist

P
Paul Newman (1925–2008), American actor and racing driver
Paul S. Newman (1924–1999), American comic-book writer
Pauline Newman (born 1927), American judge
Peter Newman (disambiguation), multiple people
Phyllis Newman (1933–2019), American actress and singer

R
Randy Newman (born 1943), American singer-songwriter and composer
Rebecca Newman (born 1981), English soprano singer and songwriter
Richard Newman (disambiguation), multiple people
Ricky Newman (born 1970), English footballer
Robert Newman (disambiguation), multiple people
Ron Newman (1934–2018), English footballer
Royce Newman (born 1997), American footballer
Ryan Newman (disambiguation), multiple people

S
Sam Newman (born 1945), Australian media executive and TV personality
Samuel Newman (1602–1663), British clergyman
Saul Newman (born 1972), British political theorist
Scott Newman (disambiguation), multiple people
Selig Newman (1788–1871), Polish-American Hebraist and editor
Stanley Newman (born 1952), American editor and crossword puzzle writer
Steve Newman (disambiguation), multiple people
Stuart Newman (born 1945), American professor
Sue Newman, Australian squash player
Sydney Newman (1917–1997), Canadian-British film and television producer

T
Terence Newman (born 1978), American football player
Thomas Newman (born 1955), singer-songwriter and composer
Tom Newman (disambiguation), multiple people
Tony Newman (disambiguation), multiple people
Troy Newman (disambiguation), multiple people

V
Victor Newman (disambiguation), multiple people

W
Walter Newman (disambiguation), multiple people
Willie Betty Newman (1863–1935), American painter
William Clifford Newman (1928–2017), American Roman Catholic bishop
William S. Newman (1912–2000), American musicologist

Fictional Newmans

Christopher Newman, the protagonist of Henry James's novel The American
Newman (first name not disclosed), a character from the U.S. sitcom Seinfeld, portrayed by Wayne Knight
D. Wire Newman, from "The Stormy Present", episode 98 of The West Wing

See also
Justice Newman (disambiguation)
Newman (disambiguation)
Neumann (disambiguation)
Numan (disambiguation)

English-language surnames